Lomberg is a Germanic surname. Notable people with the surname include:

Bjørn Lomborg (born 1965),  Danish author and environmentalist
Charles Lomberg (1886–1966), Swedish decathlete
Jon Lomberg (born 1948), American space artist and science journalist
Ryan Lomberg (born 1994), Canadian ice hockey player

Germanic-language surnames